The 2003–04 Buffalo Sabres season was the 34th season of operation for the National Hockey League franchise that was established on May 22, 1970. The Sabres failed to qualify for the playoffs for the third consecutive season.

Regular season
On March 17, 2004, Derek Roy scored just 15 seconds into the overtime period to give the Sabres a 4–3 road win over the Atlanta Thrashers. Roy tied the Blackhawks' Mark Bell, who had also scored 15 seconds into the overtime period in Chicago's 4–3 home win over the Detroit Red Wings on December 11, 2003. Both goals would end up being the fastest overtime goals scored during the 2003-04 NHL regular season.

Final standings

Schedule and results

|- align="center" bgcolor="#FFBBBB"
|1||L||October 9, 2003||0–2 || align="left"| @ Philadelphia Flyers (2003–04) ||0–1–0–0 || 
|- align="center" bgcolor="#FFBBBB"
|2||L||October 11, 2003||0–6 || align="left"|  New York Islanders (2003–04) ||0–2–0–0 || 
|- align="center" bgcolor="#CCFFCC"
|3||W||October 13, 2003||4–3 || align="left"|  Dallas Stars (2003–04) ||1–2–0–0 || 
|- align="center" bgcolor="#FFBBBB"
|4||L||October 16, 2003||1–4 || align="left"| @ Edmonton Oilers (2003–04) ||1–3–0–0 || 
|- align="center" bgcolor="#CCFFCC"
|5||W||October 18, 2003||2–0 || align="left"| @ Calgary Flames (2003–04) ||2–3–0–0 || 
|- align="center" bgcolor="#FFBBBB"
|6||L||October 20, 2003||1–6 || align="left"| @ Vancouver Canucks (2003–04) ||2–4–0–0 || 
|- align="center" bgcolor="#CCFFCC"
|7||W||October 23, 2003||5–1 || align="left"| @ Los Angeles Kings (2003–04) ||3–4–0–0 || 
|- align="center" bgcolor="#CCFFCC"
|8||W||October 24, 2003||5–2 || align="left"| @ Mighty Ducks of Anaheim (2003–04) ||4–4–0–0 || 
|- align="center" bgcolor="#CCFFCC"
|9||W||October 26, 2003||3–1 || align="left"| @ Colorado Avalanche (2003–04) ||5–4–0–0 || 
|- align="center" bgcolor="#FFBBBB"
|10||L||October 28, 2003||1–3 || align="left"|  Minnesota Wild (2003–04) ||5–5–0–0 || 
|- align="center" bgcolor="#CCFFCC"
|11||W||October 30, 2003||5–3 || align="left"|  Toronto Maple Leafs (2003–04) ||6–5–0–0 || 
|-

|- align="center"
|12||T||November 1, 2003||1–1 OT|| align="left"| @ Ottawa Senators (2003–04) ||6–5–1–0 || 
|- align="center" bgcolor="#FFBBBB"
|13||L||November 5, 2003||4–7 || align="left"|  Atlanta Thrashers (2003–04) ||6–6–1–0 || 
|- align="center" bgcolor="#CCFFCC"
|14||W||November 7, 2003||2–1 || align="left"|  Montreal Canadiens (2003–04) ||7–6–1–0 || 
|- align="center" bgcolor="#FFBBBB"
|15||L||November 8, 2003||0–3 || align="left"| @ Montreal Canadiens (2003–04) ||7–7–1–0 || 
|- align="center"
|16||T||November 12, 2003||2–2 OT|| align="left"|  New Jersey Devils (2003–04) ||7–7–2–0 || 
|- align="center" bgcolor="#FF6F6F"
|17||OTL||November 14, 2003||1–2 OT|| align="left"|  Pittsburgh Penguins (2003–04) ||7–7–2–1 || 
|- align="center" bgcolor="#CCFFCC"
|18||W||November 17, 2003||2–1 || align="left"| @ Ottawa Senators (2003–04) ||8–7–2–1 || 
|- align="center" bgcolor="#FFBBBB"
|19||L||November 19, 2003||1–4 || align="left"| @ New Jersey Devils (2003–04) ||8–8–2–1 || 
|- align="center" bgcolor="#CCFFCC"
|20||W||November 21, 2003||5–0 || align="left"|  Carolina Hurricanes (2003–04) ||9–8–2–1 || 
|- align="center" bgcolor="#FFBBBB"
|21||L||November 22, 2003||1–2 || align="left"| @ Tampa Bay Lightning (2003–04) ||9–9–2–1 || 
|- align="center" bgcolor="#FFBBBB"
|22||L||November 24, 2003||1–2 || align="left"| @ Florida Panthers (2003–04) ||9–10–2–1 || 
|- align="center" bgcolor="#CCFFCC"
|23||W||November 26, 2003||5–2 || align="left"|  Washington Capitals (2003–04) ||10–10–2–1 || 
|- align="center" bgcolor="#CCFFCC"
|24||W||November 28, 2003||4–3 || align="left"|  Florida Panthers (2003–04) ||11–10–2–1 || 
|- align="center" bgcolor="#FFBBBB"
|25||L||November 29, 2003||1–4 || align="left"| @ Nashville Predators (2003–04) ||11–11–2–1 || 
|-

|- align="center" bgcolor="#CCFFCC"
|26||W||December 3, 2003||3–2 || align="left"| @ Chicago Blackhawks (2003–04) ||12–11–2–1 || 
|- align="center" bgcolor="#FFBBBB"
|27||L||December 4, 2003||2–3 || align="left"|  Phoenix Coyotes (2003–04) ||12–12–2–1 || 
|- align="center" bgcolor="#FFBBBB"
|28||L||December 6, 2003||1–3 || align="left"|  Tampa Bay Lightning (2003–04) ||12–13–2–1 || 
|- align="center" bgcolor="#FFBBBB"
|29||L||December 10, 2003||2–7 || align="left"|  Detroit Red Wings (2003–04) ||12–14–2–1 || 
|- align="center" bgcolor="#FFBBBB"
|30||L||December 12, 2003||1–3 || align="left"|  New York Rangers (2003–04) ||12–15–2–1 || 
|- align="center" bgcolor="#FFBBBB"
|31||L||December 13, 2003||2–3 || align="left"| @ Minnesota Wild (2003–04) ||12–16–2–1 || 
|- align="center" bgcolor="#FFBBBB"
|32||L||December 16, 2003||1–2 || align="left"| @ Pittsburgh Penguins (2003–04) ||12–17–2–1 || 
|- align="center" bgcolor="#FFBBBB"
|33||L||December 19, 2003||2–5 || align="left"|  New Jersey Devils (2003–04) ||12–18–2–1 || 
|- align="center"
|34||T||December 23, 2003||2–2 OT|| align="left"|  Ottawa Senators (2003–04) ||12–18–3–1 || 
|- align="center" bgcolor="#CCFFCC"
|35||W||December 26, 2003||3–1 || align="left"|  Carolina Hurricanes (2003–04) ||13–18–3–1 || 
|- align="center" bgcolor="#CCFFCC"
|36||W||December 27, 2003||3–1 || align="left"| @ Washington Capitals (2003–04) ||14–18–3–1 || 
|- align="center" bgcolor="#FFBBBB"
|37||L||December 29, 2003||1–2 || align="left"| @ Carolina Hurricanes (2003–04) ||14–19–3–1 || 
|- align="center" bgcolor="#CCFFCC"
|38||W||December 31, 2003||7–1 || align="left"|  Washington Capitals (2003–04) ||15–19–3–1 || 
|-

|- align="center" bgcolor="#CCFFCC"
|39||W||January 2, 2004||5–2 || align="left"|  Mighty Ducks of Anaheim (2003–04) ||16–19–3–1 || 
|- align="center"
|40||T||January 3, 2004||3–3 OT|| align="left"| @ Toronto Maple Leafs (2003–04) ||16–19–4–1 || 
|- align="center" bgcolor="#FFBBBB"
|41||L||January 6, 2004||1–3 || align="left"| @ Montreal Canadiens (2003–04) ||16–20–4–1 || 
|- align="center"
|42||T||January 7, 2004||1–1 OT|| align="left"|  Philadelphia Flyers (2003–04) ||16–20–5–1 || 
|- align="center" bgcolor="#CCFFCC"
|43||W||January 9, 2004||3–2 || align="left"|  Ottawa Senators (2003–04) ||17–20–5–1 || 
|- align="center" bgcolor="#FFBBBB"
|44||L||January 12, 2004||3–4 || align="left"| @ Boston Bruins (2003–04) ||17–21–5–1 || 
|- align="center" bgcolor="#CCFFCC"
|45||W||January 13, 2004||6–2 || align="left"|  Philadelphia Flyers (2003–04) ||18–21–5–1 || 
|- align="center" bgcolor="#FFBBBB"
|46||L||January 15, 2004||0–1 || align="left"|  Boston Bruins (2003–04) ||18–22–5–1 || 
|- align="center" bgcolor="#FFBBBB"
|47||L||January 17, 2004||2–4 || align="left"| @ New York Islanders (2003–04) ||18–23–5–1 || 
|- align="center" bgcolor="#FFBBBB"
|48||L||January 20, 2004||1–4 || align="left"| @ Atlanta Thrashers (2003–04) ||18–24–5–1 || 
|- align="center" bgcolor="#CCFFCC"
|49||W||January 22, 2004||3–2 || align="left"| @ Boston Bruins (2003–04) ||19–24–5–1 || 
|- align="center" bgcolor="#FFBBBB"
|50||L||January 24, 2004||1–2 || align="left"| @ Philadelphia Flyers (2003–04) ||19–25–5–1 || 
|- align="center" bgcolor="#CCFFCC"
|51||W||January 25, 2004||4–2 || align="left"| @ Carolina Hurricanes (2003–04) ||20–25–5–1 || 
|- align="center" bgcolor="#CCFFCC"
|52||W||January 27, 2004||4–1 || align="left"|  Montreal Canadiens (2003–04) ||21–25–5–1 || 
|- align="center" bgcolor="#CCFFCC"
|53||W||January 30, 2004||3–1 || align="left"| @ New York Rangers (2003–04) ||22–25–5–1 || 
|- align="center" bgcolor="#CCFFCC"
|54||W||January 31, 2004||3–1 || align="left"|  New York Rangers (2003–04) ||23–25–5–1 || 
|-

|- align="center" bgcolor="#FFBBBB"
|55||L||February 5, 2004||2–6 || align="left"|  Boston Bruins (2003–04) ||23–26–5–1 || 
|- align="center" bgcolor="#CCFFCC"
|56||W||February 10, 2004||2–1 || align="left"|  San Jose Sharks (2003–04) ||24–26–5–1 || 
|- align="center" bgcolor="#CCFFCC"
|57||W||February 13, 2004||8–3 || align="left"|  Los Angeles Kings (2003–04) ||25–26–5–1 || 
|- align="center" bgcolor="#CCFFCC"
|58||W||February 14, 2004||6–4 || align="left"| @ Toronto Maple Leafs (2003–04) ||26–26–5–1 || 
|- align="center" bgcolor="#CCFFCC"
|59||W||February 16, 2004||7–2 || align="left"|  Atlanta Thrashers (2003–04) ||27–26–5–1 || 
|- align="center"
|60||T||February 18, 2004||1–1 OT|| align="left"|  Florida Panthers (2003–04) ||27–26–6–1 || 
|- align="center" bgcolor="#CCFFCC"
|61||W||February 20, 2004||4–3 OT|| align="left"|  Tampa Bay Lightning (2003–04) ||28–26–6–1 || 
|- align="center" bgcolor="#FFBBBB"
|62||L||February 21, 2004||1–4 || align="left"| @ New York Islanders (2003–04) ||28–27–6–1 || 
|- align="center" bgcolor="#FFBBBB"
|63||L||February 25, 2004||2–8 || align="left"| @ New Jersey Devils (2003–04) ||28–28–6–1 || 
|- align="center" bgcolor="#FFBBBB"
|64||L||February 27, 2004||2–4 || align="left"|  New York Islanders (2003–04) ||28–29–6–1 || 
|- align="center" bgcolor="#FFBBBB"
|65||L||February 28, 2004||1–7 || align="left"| @ Ottawa Senators (2003–04) ||28–30–6–1 || 
|-

|- align="center" bgcolor="#CCFFCC"
|66||W||March 3, 2004||4–3 || align="left"|  Ottawa Senators (2003–04) ||29–30–6–1 || 
|- align="center" bgcolor="#CCFFCC"
|67||W||March 6, 2004||5–1 || align="left"| @ Toronto Maple Leafs (2003–04) ||30–30–6–1 || 
|- align="center" bgcolor="#FFBBBB"
|68||L||March 7, 2004||1–5 || align="left"|  St. Louis Blues (2003–04) ||30–31–6–1 || 
|- align="center" bgcolor="#CCFFCC"
|69||W||March 10, 2004||6–0 || align="left"| @ Washington Capitals (2003–04) ||31–31–6–1 || 
|- align="center" bgcolor="#FF6F6F"
|70||OTL||March 11, 2004||2–3 OT|| align="left"|  Boston Bruins (2003–04) ||31–31–6–2 || 
|- align="center" bgcolor="#FF6F6F"
|71||OTL||March 13, 2004||2–3 OT|| align="left"| @ Boston Bruins (2003–04) ||31–31–6–3 || 
|- align="center" bgcolor="#FF6F6F"
|72||OTL||March 15, 2004||5–6 OT|| align="left"|  Toronto Maple Leafs (2003–04) ||31–31–6–4 || 
|- align="center" bgcolor="#CCFFCC"
|73||W||March 17, 2004||4–3 OT|| align="left"| @ Atlanta Thrashers (2003–04) ||32–31–6–4 || 
|- align="center" bgcolor="#FFBBBB"
|74||L||March 18, 2004||1–3 || align="left"| @ Tampa Bay Lightning (2003–04) ||32–32–6–4 || 
|- align="center" bgcolor="#CCFFCC"
|75||W||March 20, 2004||2–1 || align="left"| @ Florida Panthers (2003–04) ||33–32–6–4 || 
|- align="center" bgcolor="#CCFFCC"
|76||W||March 24, 2004||2–1 || align="left"|  Montreal Canadiens (2003–04) ||34–32–6–4 || 
|- align="center" bgcolor="#CCFFCC"
|77||W||March 26, 2004||5–1 || align="left"|  Pittsburgh Penguins (2003–04) ||35–32–6–4 || 
|- align="center"
|78||T||March 27, 2004||2–2 OT|| align="left"| @ Pittsburgh Penguins (2003–04) ||35–32–7–4 || 
|- align="center" bgcolor="#CCFFCC"
|79||W||March 29, 2004||6–0 || align="left"|  Columbus Blue Jackets (2003–04) ||36–32–7–4 || 
|- align="center" bgcolor="#CCFFCC"
|80||W||March 31, 2004||4–3 || align="left"| @ New York Rangers (2003–04) ||37–32–7–4 || 
|-

|- align="center" bgcolor="#FFBBBB"
|81||L||April 2, 2004||0–2 || align="left"|  Toronto Maple Leafs (2003–04) ||37–33–7–4 || 
|- align="center" bgcolor="#FFBBBB"
|82||L||April 3, 2004||3–6 || align="left"| @ Montreal Canadiens (2003–04) ||37–34–7–4 || 
|-

|-
| Legend:

Player statistics

Scoring
 Position abbreviations: C = Center; D = Defense; G = Goaltender; LW = Left Wing; RW = Right Wing
  = Joined team via a transaction (e.g., trade, waivers, signing) during the season. Stats reflect time with the Sabres only.
  = Left team via a transaction (e.g., trade, waivers, release) during the season. Stats reflect time with the Sabres only.

Goaltending

Awards and records

Awards

Transactions
The Sabres were involved in the following transactions from June 10, 2003, the day after the deciding game of the 2003 Stanley Cup Finals, through June 7, 2004, the day of the deciding game of the 2004 Stanley Cup Finals.

Trades

Players acquired

Players lost

Signings

Draft picks
Buffalo's draft picks at the 2003 NHL Entry Draft held at the Gaylord Entertainment Center in Nashville, Tennessee.

See also
 2003–04 NHL season

Notes

References

 
 

Buff
Buff
Buffalo Sabres seasons
Buffalo
Buffalo